Pierre Chaulet (born and died in Algiers 1930-5 October 2012) was a French doctor who worked with the FLN during the Algerian War. He performed secret operations on FLN fighters and sheltered the FLN leader Ramdane Abane. Eventually his cover was blown and he was expelled to France. Chaulet and his wife, Claudine, rejoined the FLN in Tunisia where he continued to work as a doctor and to write for the FLN paper, El Moudjahid.

It was Chaulet who introduced Frantz Fanon to the FLN, at Blida in 1955.

After Algerian independence, Chaulet joined the Mustapha Pacha hospital. He contributed to the eradication of tuberculosis in Algeria. Claudine Chaulet became a professor of sociology at the University of Algiers. In 1992, when Muhammad Boudiaf was invited back to Algeria after an exile of 27 years, he asked for Pierre Chaulet's assistance.

Chaulet was a member of the Conseil national économique et social (CNES) in Algeria. He died on the 5 October 2012, and was buried in Diar Saâda's Christian Cemetery.

References 

People from Algiers
2012 deaths
1930 births
People of the Algerian War
Algerian people of French descent
Algerian pulmonologists
21st-century Algerian people